Phylloporus rhodoxanthus, commonly known as the gilled bolete, is a species of fungus in the family Boletaceae. As suggested by its common name, the distinctive feature of this species is its yellow gills—an unusual feature on a bolete mushroom.

Taxonomy
The species was first described as Agaricus rhodoxanthus by Lewis David de Schweinitz in 1822. Giacomo Bresadola transferred it to Phylloporus in 1900.

Description 

The cap margin is initially curved inward. The cap surface is dry, with a somewhat velvet-like texture, and often develops cracks in maturity that reveal the pale yellow flesh underneath. Its color ranges from dull red to reddish brown, to reddish yellow, or olive brown. The flesh has no distinct taste or odor. The gills are decurrent to somewhat decurrent, and well-spaced. They are deep yellow to greenish-yellow, often wrinkled, and usually have cross-veins in the spaces between the gills; these cross-veins sometimes give the gills a somewhat pore-like appearance. The stem is firm and solid (i.e., not hollow), and yellow, with yellow mycelium at the base. It frequently has longitudinal grooves extending down from the gills.

Phylloporus rhodoxanthus produces an olivaecous yellow-brown spore print. Spores are elliptical to spindle-shaped, smooth, and measure 9–14 by 3.5–5 um.

Relatively similar in appearance to Phylloporus rhodoxanthus is P. leucomycelinus, and these two are frequently confused, especially since their distributions overlap. The latter species can be distinguished by the presence of white mycelium at the base of its stem.

Uses

The mushrooms are edible, and considered good by some. The flavor has been described as "tender and nutty", and drying the fruit bodies first enhances the flavor. Suitable culinary uses include sauteing, adding to sauces or stuffings, or raw as a colorful garnish. They are used to make mushroom dyes of beige, greenish beige, or gold colors, depending on the mordant used.

Habitat and distribution
The fruit bodies of Phylloporus rhodoxanthus grow on the ground singly or in small groups in deciduous forests, especially those with oak and pine. The species has a wide distribution in North America, where it fruits from July to October. It is also known from Asia (China, India, and Taiwan), Australia, and Europe.

See also
List of North American boletes

References

External links

rhodoxanthus
Edible fungi
Fungi described in 1822
Fungi of Asia
Fungi of Australia
Fungi of North America
Fungi of Europe
Taxa named by Lewis David de Schweinitz